Sari Daraq may refer to:
 Sari Daraq, Ardabil
 Sari Daraq, Abish Ahmad, Kaleybar County, East Azerbaijan Province
 Sari Daraq, Meyaneh, East Azerbaijan Province